Majidadi is a ward in Jalingo, the capital city of Taraba State, Nigeria.

References 

Local Government Areas in Taraba State